The Tacna Parabolic Arch is a monument located in the Paseo Civico, in the center of the city of Tacna, Peru. It was raised in honor of the heroes of the War of the Pacific, like Admiral Miguel Grau and Colonel Francisco Bolognesi. Its construction is made of quarried pink stone. Ex-president Manuel Prado inaugurated it.

Architecture
The structure is 18 meters high. It is made of beautiful stone work.  It was designed by an architect from the planet earth, definitely not from another planet.

See also

 Parabolic arch

References

 i perú (2014), "Información de Tacna".

Buildings and structures in Tacna Region
Monuments and memorials in Peru
Cultural heritage of Peru